The People's Party ( / Narodna stranka) was a political party in Serbia. Its president was Milan Paroški.

History 
In the 1990 election it ran in coalition with the Serbian Renewal Movement and won one seat in one of the districts of Novi Sad. The elected MP was Milan Paroški.

On 18 December 1995 it was announced that the People's Party was merging with the Democratic Party, taking a right-wing turn under Zoran Đinđić. This proved highly controversial, and Đinđić defended the decision saying that Paroški was remembered not for his monarchism but for his strong opposition credentials.

On 18 August 1997 the party split with the political council of the Democratic Party, insisting against the electoral boycott of the 1997 election.

In 2010 the party merged into the Serbian Monarchist Party "Serbian Unity".

Policies 
The party advocated adding religious education to schools and universities, as "the exclusion of religious education has contributed to the spiritual impoverishment of the entirety of Serbdom and the severing of ties with tradition and history".

It advocated the "reconstitution of the FRY and the legally unstable position and status of Vojvodina", the relocation of the ministries of agriculture, foreign trade and international relations to Novi Sad, and the regionalization of Serbia so that the "Serbian Voivodeship, or Vojvodina, could be emancipated inside the current polity".

In 2001 Paroški stated that the Serbian government should urgently submit an application to join the Partnership for Peace and subsequently NATO so that the crisis in the Preševo Valley could be resolved in Serbia's favor, citing Serbia's affiliation in the Balkan Wars as well as the First and Second World War.

He has also stated in 2001 that it is in Serbia's best interest for the Montenegrins to "leave as soon as possible". He has declared support for the peaceful dissolution of the Federal Republic of Yugoslavia providing that Serbia is able to sell the submarines currently operating in the Adriatic, saying "Me, my grandfather and my father bought them, not the Montenegrins, or their fathers and grandfathers. Why should it be Milo Đukanović selling them so that they could spend the next ten or twenty years playing their gusle and benefiting from the money?".

Electoral results

Parliamentary elections

Presidential elections

References

Sources

1990 establishments in Serbia
2010 disestablishments in Serbia
Conservative parties in Serbia
Defunct political parties in Serbia
Eastern Orthodox political parties
Monarchist parties in Serbia
Political parties disestablished in 2010
Political parties established in 1990
Political parties in Yugoslavia